The Government of New Brunswick refers to the provincial government of the province of New Brunswick.  Its powers and structure are set out in the Constitution Act, 1867.

The Province of New Brunswick is now governed by a unicameral legislature, the Legislative Assembly of New Brunswick, which operates in the Westminster system of government minus the bicamerality. The political party that, either by itself or in combination with another party supporting them, wins the largest number of seats in the legislature normally forms the government with the party's leader becoming premier of the province, i.e., the head of the government.

Lieutenant-Governor of New Brunswick 

The functions of the Sovereign, King Charles III, King of Canada, are known in New Brunswick as the King in Right of New Brunswick, and exercised by the Lieutenant Governor of New Brunswick. The Lieutenant Governor is appointed by the Governor General of Canada on the recommendation of the Prime Minister of Canada, in consultation with the Premier of New Brunswick.

Departments 
 Department of Agriculture, Aquaculture and Fisheries
 Opportunities NB, former Department of Economic Development
 Department of Education
 Department of Energy and Mines
 Department of Environment and Local Government
 Department of Finance
 Department of Government Services
 Department of Health
 Department of Human Resources
 Department of Intergovernmental Affairs
 Department of Justice
 Department of Natural Resources
 Department of Post-Secondary Education, Training and Labour
 Department of Public Safety
 Department of Social Development
 Department of Tourism, Heritage and Culture
 Department of Transportation and Infrastructure
 Department of Healthy and Inclusive Communities

Offices 

 Executive Council Office
 Office of the Attorney General
 Office of the Premier

Agencies/Boards 

 Efficiency New Brunswick
 New Brunswick Arts Board
 New Brunswick Emergency Measures Organization
 New Brunswick Insurance Board
 Premier's Council on the Status of Disabled Persons

Commissions/Corporations 

 Financial and Consumer Services Commission
 Kings Landing Historical Settlement
 NB Power
 New Brunswick Credit Union Deposit Insurance Corporation
 New Brunswick Energy and Utilities Board
 New Brunswick Human Rights Commission
 New Brunswick Investment Management Corporation
 New Brunswick Liquor Corporation
 New Brunswick Police Commission
 Regional Development Corporation
 Service New Brunswick
 Village Historique Acadien
 WorkSafe NB

See also 

Administrative divisions of New Brunswick
Politics of New Brunswick
2006 New Brunswick general election
2010 New Brunswick general election
2014 New Brunswick general election
2018 New Brunswick general election

External links
 Official Site